József Vadas (19 September 1911 – 5 June 2006) was a Hungarian sprinter who competed in the 1936 Summer Olympics. He was born in Székesfehérvár.

References

1911 births
2006 deaths
Sportspeople from Székesfehérvár
Hungarian male sprinters
Olympic athletes of Hungary
Athletes (track and field) at the 1936 Summer Olympics